Diego Junqueira is the defending champion, but lost in the quarterfinals.
Carlos Berlocq won the title, defeating Gastão Elias 6–1, 7–6(7–3) in the final.

Seeds

Draw

Finals

Top half

Bottom half

References
 Main Draw
 Qualifying Draw

Copa Topper - Singles
2011 Singles